Rock oysters are true oysters of the genus Saccostrea, belonging to the subfamily Saccostreinae  of the family Ostreidae . 

The best-known species is the Sydney rock oyster (Saccostrea glomerata).

Species 
The World Register of Marine Species lists these species:
 Saccostrea circumsuta (Gould, 1850)
 Saccostrea cucullata (Born, 1778) – hooded oyster
 Saccostrea echinata (Quoy & Gaimard, 1835) – tropical black-lip rock oyster
 Saccostrea glomerata (Gould, 1850) - Sydney rock oyster
 Saccostrea kegaki Torigoe & Inaba, 1981
 Saccostrea malabonensis (Faustino, 1932) – Philippine hooded oyster (talabang kukong kabayo)
 Saccostrea mordoides Z.-M. Cui, L.-S. Hu, C. Li, Z. Zhang, X.-M. Guo & H.-Y. Wang, 2021
 Saccostrea palmula (Carpenter, 1857)
 † Saccostrea saccellus (Dujardin, 1837) 
 Saccostrea scyphophilla (Peron & Lesueur, 1807)
 Saccostrea spathulata (Lamarck, 1819)
 Saccostrea subtrigona (G.B. Sowerby II, 1871)
 † Saccostrea virleti (Deshayes, 1835) 
Synonyms
 Saccostrea commercialis (Iredale & Roughley, 1933): synonym of Saccostrea glomerata (Gould, 1850)
 Saccostrea cucullata [sic]: synonym of Saccostrea cuccullata (Born, 1778) (misspelling)
 Saccostrea forskahlii (Gmelin, 1791): synonym of Saccostrea cuccullata (Born, 1778)
 Saccostrea margaritacea (Lamarck, 1819): synonym of Striostrea margaritacea (Lamarck, 1819)
 Saccostrea mordax (Gould, 1850): synonym of Saccostrea scyphophilla (Peron & Lesueur, 1807)
 Saccostrea tubulifera (Dall, 1914): synonym of Saccostrea palmula (Carpenter, 1857)

References

 Dollfus, G.F. & Dautzenberg, P. (1920). Conchyliologie du Miocène moyen du Bassin de la Loire. 1re Partie: Pélécypodes (suite et fin). Mémoires de la Société Géologique de France, Paléontologie. 22(2-4): 379-500, pls 34-51.
 Coan, E. V.; Valentich-Scott, P. (2012). Bivalve seashells of tropical West America. Marine bivalve mollusks from Baja California to northern Peru. 2 vols, 1258 pp.

External links
 Harry, H.W. (1985). Synopsis of the supraspecific classification of living oysters (Bivalvia: Gryphaeidae and Ostreidae. The Veliger. 28(2): 121-158.
  Salvi D. & Mariottini P. (2017 [nomenclatural availability: 2016). Molecular taxonomy in 2D: a novel ITS2 rRNA sequence-structure approach guides the description of the oysters' subfamily Saccostreinae and the genus Magallana (Bivalvia: Ostreidae). Zoological Journal of the Linnean Society. 179(2): 263-276.]